The Integrated Test Range (ITR) is an Indian defence laboratory of the Defence Research and Development Organisation (DRDO). Located in Balasore, Odisha, it provide safe and reliable launch facilities for performance evaluation of rockets, missiles and air-borne weapon system. The present director of ITR is Sri. H K Ratha.

History

References

External links
integrated-test-range

1982 establishments in Orissa
Government agencies established in 1982
Defence Research and Development Organisation laboratories
Research and development in India
Research institutes established in 1982
Education in Odisha